The mediastinal branches are numerous small vessels which supply the lymph glands and loose areolar tissue in the posterior mediastinum.

References 

Arteries of the thorax